Paramulona is a genus of moths in the subfamily Arctiinae. The genus was erected by George Hampson in 1900.

Species
Paramulona albulata
Paramulona baracoa
Paramulona nephelistis
Paramulona schwarzi

References

Lithosiini
Moth genera